Utah State Route 50 may refer to:

 Utah State Route 50, the state highway designation (legislative overlay) for the two non-concurrent sections of U.S. Route 50 (excluding its concurrencies with Interstate 15, Interstate 70, U.S. Route 6, U.S. Route 89, and U.S. Route 191) within Utah, United States, that run through Millard and Sevier counties
 By  Utah State law, U.S. Route 50 within the state (except its concurrencies) has been defined as "State Route 50" since 1977
 Utah State Route 50 (1969-1977), the state highway designation (legislative overlay) for the section of U.S. Route 91 in western Weber and southeastern Box Elder counties, Utah, United States, that ran northerly from Utah State Route 84 (now Utah State Route 126) in Roy (in southwestern Weber County) along Washington Boulevard in Ogden to Utah State Route 84 (now U.S. Route 89) at Hot Springs Junction in South Willard (in southeastern Box Elder County)
 Utah State Route 50 (1935-1969), a former state highway on the Wasatch Plateau in southwestern Carbon County, Utah, United States, that connected  Utah State Route 122 (east of Hiawatha) with Wattis

See also

 List of state highways in Utah
 List of U.S. Highways in Utah
 List of named highway junctions in Utah
 List of highways numbered 50

External links

 Utah Department of Transportation Highway Resolutions: Route 50 (PDF)